Cinzano is an Italian brand of vermouth, a brand owned since 1999 by Gruppo Campari.

History
Cinzano vermouths date back to 1757 and the Turin herbal shop of two brothers, Giovanni Giacomo and Carlo Stefano Cinzano, who created a new "vermouth rosso" (red vermouth) using "aromatic plants from the Italian Alps in a [still-secret] recipe combining 35 ingredients (including marjoram, thyme, and yarrow)".  What became known as the "vermouth of Turin" proved popular with the bourgeoisie of Turin and, later, Casanova.

Cinzano Bianco followed, based on a different combination of herbs that included artemisia (wormwood), cinnamon, cloves, citrus and gentian; it was followed by an Extra Dry version. Exports began in the 1890s, to Argentina, Brazil and the USA, among others. In Paris in 1913, Cinzano was the first product to be advertised with a neon sign on its roof.

Cinzano remained a family-run business until 1985.  Beginning that year, the Marone family, Turin industrialists, began to sell shares in the business, culminating in 1992 with an agreement to turn Cinzano International S.A. entirely over to International Distillers & Vintners, a wholly owned subsidiary of Grand Metropolitan. At the time of its sale, Cinzano's share of the vermouth market in Europe was measured in the low single digits, sales that placed it a distant second to Martini.

As a result of a 1997 merger, Grand Metropolitan became Diageo; two years later, Diageo sold Cinzano to the privately held Gruppo Campari.

The Cinzano cycling team had a central role in the film Breaking Away.

Versions
It comes in four versions:

 Cinzano Rosso, which is amber-coloured;
 Cinzano Bianco, which is white and drier than Rosso, yet still considered a sweet vermouth;
 Cinzano Extra Dry, a dry vermouth;
 Cinzano Rosé, the newest of the four, rosy-coloured with orange highlights

Advertising
Cinzano was well known in Britain for its humorous television advertisements featuring Leonard Rossiter and Joan Collins. One of these featured the pair on a plane journey, with Rossiter accidentally hitting the "recline" switch on Collins' chair, causing her to spill a glass of the drink over herself. It also featured as a Sterling Cooper-promoted brand on the series Mad Men.

See also
 List of Italian companies

References

1757 establishments in Italy
Campari Group
Distilleries in Italy
Wineries of Italy
Purveyors to the Imperial and Royal Court
Vermouth
Italian companies established in 1757
Food and drink companies established in 1757